Fort Braden is a historic location and census-designated place (CDP) in western Leon County, Florida, United States. It was first listed as a CDP in the 2020 census with a population of 1,045.

Demographics

2020 census

Note: the US Census treats Hispanic/Latino as an ethnic category. This table excludes Latinos from the racial categories and assigns them to a separate category. Hispanics/Latinos can be of any race.

History 

On December 3, 1839, Fort Braden was established as a military fort during the Second Seminole War, 1st Lieutenant Seth B. Thornton of Company G, 2nd U.S. Dragoons built the fort and was its first Commanding Officer. The list of Commanding Officers were as follows:

January 1840 – February 1840 – Lt. Seth Barton Thornton Company G, Second (Howes) Dragoons

February 1840 – March 1840 – Capt. S Eastman First Infantry (Temporary Assignment until C.A. May arrived)

March 4, 1840 – July 1840 – Lt. C.A. May Company G, Second Dragoons

August 1840 – November 1840 – Capt. Arthur Burney Mounted Militia, General Leigh Reed Territorial Militia  (Unit was Mustered Out)

December 1840 – March 1841 Capt. Mew Mounted Militia, General Reed, Territorial Militia (Mustered at Fort Braden and Mustered Out)

July 31, 1842 -- June 7, 1842, Deserted/Occupied as necessary by Federals/Militia

April 7, 1842 -- June 7, 1842, Capt. S.B. Thornton Company F, Second Dragoons

It was near the Ochlockonee River on the 126 feet contour just south of the then "Pork Creek" (now known as Polk Creek) eighteen miles southwest of Tallahassee. Fort Braden was named for Virginia Braden, formerly Virginia Ward. She married Dr. Joseph Braden, a prominent citizen of Tallahassee. Joseph Braden's brother, Hector, was director of Tallahassee's Union Bank.

Virginia was the daughter of Leon County plantation owner George T. Ward, of Southwood Plantation and Waverly Plantation.

On July 12, 1840, a fight with Indians by two soldiers of Company B of the 2nd Infantry stationed at Fort Braden resulted in their deaths, The two soldiers were traveling from Fort White, Florida back to Fort Braden (mistakenly reported in some newspaper accounts of the incident as “Fort Brady”) and were attacked in Cow Creek Hammock about 4 miles from Fort White.  Cow Creek is a creek that runs into the Santa Fe River close by Fort White.

The incident was reported in the Daily Chronicle & Sentinel (Augusta, Ga.) on July 31, 1840:

“A daring murder was committed on the 12th ins. [July] at the hammock of Cow Creek, near Fort White.  Sgt. Ziegler and Cpl Sweatman of Company B, 2nd Inf. were returning from Fort White to Fort Brady [Braden], the Sgt mounted and the Corp’l on foot.  At the place before mentioned, they were fired upon by a party of 21 Indians.  The Corporal was undoubtedly immediately killed, but the sergeant, it would appear, tho’ badly wounded, fought until knocked down by superior numbers.  The bodies of both soldiers were horribly mutilated in a manner too revolting for publication.  After the murder, the Indians blazed a tree where they painted a figure of an Indian under which they made 21 marks indicative of their number.  Against the tree they placed an iron pointed arrow dipped in the blood of their victims.  The next day they were pursued by a party of 23 men under Captain J.R, Smith, but to no purpose.”

The soldiers, Sergeant William Ziegler and Corporal Daniel Sweatman were initially interred in Cow Creek hammock community near Fort White.  Their military records indicate they were reinterred in the Saint Augustine National Cemetery in 1907 under the pyramids there that identify soldiers killed during this period.

Fort Braden was abandoned on June 7, 1842, at the conclusion of the Second Seminole War.  The historical site is on a 94 acre parcel of privately held land of the Herold family at approximate GPS 30.25.50 -84.32.00. For years the actual site of Fort Braden, or Fort Virginia Braden, has been speculated to be one of several places known as Jackson Bluffs between the original channel of the Oclocknee River (now flooded by Lake Talquin) and Highway 20 in SW Leon County. Several were close, but none documented the actual location, but it was hidden in "plain sight" being documented in a legal historical Platt Book and Survey for a large north Florida land purchase known as the Forbes' Purchase, <1852-1856> that contained printed forms and maps, some of which were completed in manuscript by surveyors Randolph and Hunter; McIver and Galbraith, James D. Galbraith; Hodgson, Randolph and Hunter; M.A. Williams, and McIver and Louis.  The documents are available in the FSU Strozier Library Special Collections and Archives Florida (Oversize) F314 .P56 1852a, and showed the Fort location, surrounding fields, and path of the old Fort Braden Road that led right up to the front gates of the Fort. 

The survey shows the Fort is located south of “Pork Creek" (now known as Polk Creek), a tributary to the Oclocknee River, built at the 120 feet elevation.  It is located on private property, owned currently by the Herold Family Trust, but was also owned in 1999 by the Herold Family that farmed the land, and later planted it as a tree farm, which is the current state of the property.  No visible signs remain of the Fort structure that is located at approximately 30 degrees 25 minutes 50 seconds North, 84 degrees 32 minutes West, but an exhibit from a 1999 Masters Thesis written by FSU student Wendy Richard shows the location of the Fort and surrounding fields.  Wendy’s Thesis shows the archeological work that was done by her team at the site in 1999. The details of the artifacts discovered at the site are cataloged in detail of the Thesis available at the FSU Strozier Library, General Collections E83.835 .R53 1999  titled "Looking for Fort Braden: A Second Seminole War Fort 1839-1842."

Like other forts around the nation, a small community had grown near this fort. In 1843 an E.M. Garnett attending the Leon County Convention in Tallahassee came from the area. In 1847 collection of taxes took place at the Fort Braden School House. In 1856 and 1872 Fort Braden was one of the voting precincts in Leon County.

Cotton planters 
Though Fort Braden was south of the cotton rich Red Hills Region, it had successful planters Hugh Black, H.H. Black, P.B. Chanlers, John Gray, Joseph Haines, C. Gray, John Grissette, R.L. Harvey, and J. E. Williams.

Early churches 
It is reported that in Florida State Gazetteer of 1886-1887 that Fort Braden had one Methodist church and one Baptist church.

Other buildings 
Fort Braden is reported to have had a school house, a blacksmith shop, a grist mill, and a cotton gin.

See also 
 Old Fort Braden School

References 

Fort Braden School
Florida State Library Collection in Tallahassee, Call No. 71, M. No. 617, Roll No. 1497, "Post Returns from Ft. Braden, Fl. Jan. 1840-May 1842;" see also Julia Floyd Smith, Slavery and Plantation Growth in Antebellum Florida (Gainesville: 1973), 131.
David A. Eldredge, Finding Florida Forts (Fort Lauderdale, 1990), 39.
Tallahassee Floridian, August 7, 1847.
Tallahassee Floridian & Journal, October 11, 1856; and Tallahassee Weekly

Populated places in Leon County, Florida
History of Leon County, Florida
Braden
Populated places established in 1839
1839 establishments in Florida Territory
Census-designated places in Leon County, Florida
Census-designated places in Florida